Kuzmina is a rural locality (a village) in Oshibskoye Rural Settlement, Kudymkarsky District, Perm Krai, Russia. The population was 61 as of 2010.

Geography 
Kuzmina is located 29 km northeast of Kudymkar (the district's administrative centre) by road. Pleshkova is the nearest rural locality.

References 

Rural localities in Kudymkarsky District